The United Nations Security Council Resolution 141 was adopted unanimously on July 5, 1960, recommending to the General Assembly the admission of the Republic of the Congo (Léopoldville) to membership in the United Nations.

See also
List of United Nations Security Council Resolutions 101 to 200 (1953–1965)

References
Text of the Resolution at undocs.org

External links
 

 0142
 0142
 0142
1960 in the Republic of the Congo (Léopoldville)
July 1960 events